Clouds of May is a 1999 Turkish film directed by Nuri Bilge Ceylan.

Cast
 Emin Ceylan
 Muzaffer Özdemir
 Fatma Ceylan
 Emin Toprak
 Muhammed Zımbaoğlu
 Sadık İncesu

Reception
On Metacritic, the film has an average score of 75 out of 100, indicating "generally favorable reviews". A. O. Scott of The New York Times argued that “for much of its running time, it feels diffuse and anecdotal, but in retrospect you appreciate the subtlety and heft of the story, as well as the tricky profundity of Mr. Ceylan's approach [...] part of its magic lies in Mr. Ceylan's ability to place the world plainly before your eyes and invite you to reflect on its everyday mysteries”.
In Variety, David Stratton stated that “the inordinately long preliminaries of the first hour could well be tightened. The second half, however, builds to an understated but moving and extremely satisfying climax.” The reviewer described Ceylan as having “a sly sense of humor and a deep emotional link to his characters”.

References

External links
 
 DVD review of film
 Clouds of May at altcine

1999 drama films
1999 films
Films directed by Nuri Bilge Ceylan
Films set in Turkey
Golden Orange Avni Tolunay Jury Special Award winners
European Film Awards winners (films)
1990s Turkish-language films
Turkish drama films